Lateral Link Group, is a legal recruiting firm for attorneys that was founded in December 2005 by several Harvard Law School alumni. The company specializes in placing attorneys at top-tier firms and companies and provides career services to Members including a proprietary online job database. Lateral Link's clients include both law firms and in-house legal employers in the United States, Asia, Western Europe, and Middle East. Starting in 2015, Lateral Link began offering variable staffing opportunities to its members through its partner, Cadence Counsel. In 2017, Lateral Link acquired Bridgeline Solutions, a temporary legal staffing company.

Introduction 
Lateral Link Group, is a legal recruiting firm with 13 offices in the United States and Asia. The firm works with both law firms and in-house legal employers in the United States, Asia, Western Europe, and Middle East. Michael Allen, the company's founder, currently serves as CEO.

Timeline
December 2005: Lateral Link Founded
January 2007: Recapitalization; Company Shows Net Profit
January 2008: Western Europe Based Business Established
June 2008: First Legal Placement Firm to Offer Free Career Counseling
July 2008: Partnership with Cornell's BR Legal
February 2015: Announces Lateral Link Endowed Fund At Harvard
October 2015: Lateral Link acquires Ad Hoc staffing agency, Cadence Counsel
June 2017: Lateral Link acquires Staffing Firm, Bridgeline Solutions

References

 Fortado, Lindsay. Lehman, Merrill Will Damage Lawyer's Careers, Survey Says. <https://www.bloomberg.com/apps/news?pid=newsarchive&sid=aTEWMTF.ROao>. Bloomberg.com (Retrieved September 18, 2008).
 Cassens Weiss, Debra. 42% of Lawyers Surveyed Fear Fallout From Lehman Woes. <http://www.abajournal.com/news/42_of_lawyers_surveyed_fear_career_fallout_from_lehman_woes/>. American Bar Association Journal. (Retrieved September 18, 2008)
 Iafolla, Robert. Web-based Recruiting Firm Shuns Cold Calls.  The Daily Journal (Retrieved June 25, 2006) <http://www.laterallink.com/about/press#q6>
 Lowe, Zach. Will New Legal Recruiters Succeed With Pay-to-Place Business Model? <http://www.law.com/jsp/article.jsp?id=1202422383197&rss=newswire> . The American Lawyer. (Retrieved August 2008).
 Needleman, Sarah E.  Careers: Members Only <https://www.wsj.com/articles/SB119998551341381221> .  The Wall Street Journal (Retrieved May 15, 2008).
 Orey, Michael. Lawyers in the Lurch. <http://images.businessweek.com/ss/08/07/0717_btw/4.htm?chan=search> . Business Week (Retrieved August 2008).
 Sandler, Betsy.  Finding Top Talent. How Lateral Link helps corporate legal departments get the best people. 8-K.  (Retrieved Spring 2008)
 Garmhausen, Steve. Nomads Shut Down Offices for Good. Crain's New York Business. <http://www.crainsnewyork.com/apps/pbcs.dll/article?AID=/20081012/SMALLBIZ/310129977/1010/toc>. (Retrieved November 2008)
 Bronstad, Amanda. Effects of Financial Collapse Worry Lawyers, Law Students. The National Law Journal. 18 September 2008. <http://www.law.com/jsp/article.jsp?id=1202424627231>.
 Weiss, Tara. How to Headhunt the Headhunters. Forbes.com. 18 September 2008.  <>.  
 Ramstack, Tom. Ramstack: Plunge also Hits Lawyers. The Washington Times. 22 September 2008. <http://www.washingtontimes.com/news/2008/sep/22/plunge-also-hits-lawyers/>.
 Wasserman, Elizabeth. Tech Talk: Recruiter Markets via Social Networks. Inc.com <https://web.archive.org/web/20090220160948/http://technology.inc.com/internet/articles/200810/tech_talk_allen.html> (Retrieved 6 November 2009).
Lateral Link. (2015, October 8). Lateral Link Acquires Top Tier Legal Staffing Firm, Cadence Counsel [Press release]. Business Wire. Retrieved from http://www.businesswire.com/news/home/20151008006498/en/Lateral-Link-Acquires-Top-Tier-Legal-Staffing

Employment agencies of the United States